Amanda Merrill (born May 9, 1951) is a Democratic former member of the New Hampshire Senate from Durham, serving from 2008 to 2012.  She represented Senate District 21, which comprised Dover, Durham, Epping, Lee, and Rollinsford.  Merrill served on the Education; Election Law and Veteran's Affairs; Energy, Environment and Economic Development; and Wildlife, Fish and Game and Agriculture committees in the Senate.

Family
Merrill lives in Durham with her husband, Kenneth Fuld, who is Dean of the College of Liberal Arts at the University of New Hampshire. They have two children, Anna and Sam Fuld, an outfielder in Major League Baseball from 2007 to 2015 and now the General Manager of the Philadelphia Phillies.  They also have a grandson.

References

External links
 

University of New Hampshire alumni
Dartmouth College alumni
Democratic Party New Hampshire state senators
Women state legislators in New Hampshire
Democratic Party members of the New Hampshire House of Representatives
Living people
1951 births
People from Durham, New Hampshire
21st-century American women